Tenaspis is a genus of fireflies in the beetle family Lampyridae. There are about 18 described species in Tenaspis.

Species
These 18 species belong to the genus Tenaspis:

 Tenaspis acuta E. Olivier, 1909
 Tenaspis angularis (Gorham, 1880)
 Tenaspis auricolor E. Olivier, 1911
 Tenaspis brumalis E. Olivier in Wytsman, 1907
 Tenaspis cauta E. Olivier, 1911
 Tenaspis figurata E. Olivier, 1912
 Tenaspis fulvibasis E. Olivier, 1911
 Tenaspis gonzalensis Zaragoza-Caballero, 1995
 Tenaspis gonzalenzis Zaragoza, 1995
 Tenaspis lugubris (Gorham, 1881)
 Tenaspis maculata Pic, 1932
 Tenaspis mansueta E. Olivier in Wytsman, 1907
 Tenaspis mundata E. Olivier, 1907
 Tenaspis peccata Blackwelder, 1945
 Tenaspis rufibasis E. Olivier, 1909
 Tenaspis semifusca (Gorham, 1880)
 Tenaspis sinuosa E. Olivier, 1899
 Tenaspis zonulata E. Olivier, 1913

References

Further reading

 
 

Lampyridae
Articles created by Qbugbot